The World's Tallest Thermometer is a landmark in Baker, California, US. It is a steel electric sign that commemorates the weather record of  recorded in nearby Death Valley on July 10, 1913. 

History
It was built in 1991 by the Young Electric Sign Company of Salt Lake City, Utah for Willis Herron, a Baker businessman who spent $700,000 to build the thermometer next to his Bun Boy restaurant. Its height—134 feet—was in honor of the 134-degree record temperature set in nearby Death Valley on July 10, 1913.

Soon after its construction, 70-mph winds snapped the thermometer in half, and it was rebuilt. Two years later, severe gusts made the thermometer sway so much that its light bulbs popped out. Concrete was then poured inside the steel core to reinforce the monument.

Herron sold the attraction and restaurant to another local businessman, Larry Dabour, who sold it in 2005.  In September 2012, the owner at that time, Matt Pike, said that the power bill for its operation had reached $8,000 per month and that he turned it off due to the poor economy.  In 2013, the thermometer and accompanying empty gift shop were listed for sale. The family of Willis Herron (who died in 2007) recovered ownership of the property in 2014 and stated their intention to make it operational again. The official re-lighting took place on July 10, 2014.

In December 2016, EVgo announced building the first US fast charge station for electric vehicles at up to 350 kW.  The station is located in the rear parking area behind the thermometer, visible to travelers on Interstate 15.

References

External links

 
 Roadside America

1991 establishments in California
Individual signs in the United States
Landmarks in California
Mojave Desert
Roadside attractions in California
Thermometers
Towers completed in 1991
Tourist attractions in San Bernardino County, California